Mark Beaumont may refer to:

 Mark Beaumont (cyclist) (born 1983), Scottish cyclist, adventurer, broadcaster, documentary maker and author
 Mark Beaumont (journalist) (born 1972), English music journalist